Metalization may refer to one of a number of different processes:

Coating a covering applied an object's surface that improves surface properties: adhesion,  resistance to corrosion or wear or scratches. 
Metallizing (also metalize) to coat, treat, or combine with a metal.
Thermal spraying  melted (or heated) materials are sprayed onto a surface.
Vacuum deposition  is a family of processes used to deposit layers as thin as one atom to millimeters thick in a vacuum.
Vacuum metallizing the metallic coating of an object takes place in a vacuum chamber. 
Vacuum coating a mechanized process for applying coatings to lengths of materials.
Transition of a nonmetal to a metallic substance due to a change of allotrope or closure of a bandgap, usually at very high pressures
Metalation, a reaction between an organometallic compound and another organic compound which typically includes a halide group